The Kaczawa, in English Katzbach, is a river in the Lower Silesian Voivodeship in  Poland. It springs from the Kaczawskie Mountains near Kaczorów and flows north and northeast through the towns of Świerzawa, Złotoryja and Legnica.  Among its tributaries is the Czarna Woda.  After a length of  the Kaczawa empties into the Oder river at Prochowice.

Kaczawa between Legnica and Dunino was the site of the Battle of the Katzbach on 26 August 1813 during the Napoleonic Wars.

References
 

Rivers of Lower Silesian Voivodeship
Rivers of Poland